Terry Amburgey is an American engineer, currently a William L. Giles Professor at Mississippi State University and an Elected Fellow of the International Academy of Wood Science.

References

Mississippi State University faculty
21st-century American engineers
North Carolina State University alumni
Living people
Year of birth missing (living people)
Place of birth missing (living people)